Changhua County legislative districts consist of 4 single-member constituencies, each represented by a member of the Republic of China Legislative Yuan.

Current districts

Changhua County Constituency 1 - Shengang, Xianxi, Hemei, Lukang, Fuxing, Xiushui Townships
Changhua County Constituency 2 - Huatan, Fenyuan Townships, Changhua City
Changhua County Constituency 3 - Fangyuan, Erlin, Puyan, Xihu, Puxin, Dacheng, Zhutang, Pitou, Beidou, Xizhou Townships
Changhua County Constituency 4 - Dacun, Yongjing, Shetou, Tianwei, Tianzhong, Ershui Townships, Yuanlin City

Legislators

 Wei Ming-ku resigned in 2014 after elected Changhua County magistrate.

 Wang Huei-mei resigned in 2018 after elected Changhua County magistrate.

Election results

2020

2019 By-election

2016

References

Constituencies in Taiwan
Changhua County